Luc André Diouf Dioh (born 18 January 1965) is a Senegalese-Spanish politician as well as a trade unionist and syndicalist. He is known in the Spanish media for being the first politician of African descent elected from the Spanish Socialist Workers' Party, as well as for being homeless in the past and having to sleep on a beach of the Canary Islands for over a month.

Personal life
Diouf was born in Joal-Fadiouth, an island off the coast of Senegal. He is one of 10 siblings, with eight brothers and one sister, and grew up in an agricultural environment. Unlike most of Senegal, Diouf was raised Roman Catholic and most of his community was Christian.

Diouf attended the Cheikh Anta Diop University in the Senegalese capital of Dakar where he studied economics. After leaving the university, Diouf traveled to Lyon, then Utrecht, and then Cincinnati in search of work. In 1992 he emigrated to Gran Canaria because he had family members living there. He quickly ran out of money though and for 42 days Diouf was homeless and had to sleep on the beach. Eventually Diouf contracted pneumonia and had to be taken to a hospital in Las Palmas, where one of the nurses put him in contact with social workers. He would later get a job at a hotel in Jandía on the island of Fuerteventura and would also find work as a computer technician. Diof is a polyglot who speaks several languages: Wolof, Serer, French, and Spanish. He learned German while interacting with tourists at his hotel job.

In 2008 he received a one-year-and-a-half prison sentence for injuring another man in a street fight in 2005. Luc André falsely indicates that it began due to the racist comments of the victim, despite the fact that the sentence does not refer at any time to racist behavior. The victim was an elderly person who was kicked in the head by Luc André, leaving him with lifelong injuries, as reflected in the sentence.

In 1996 Diouf joined the Workers' Commissions, or CCOO, where he worked as an advisory technician, as coordinator in the union's immigrant information centers, and as the secretary of immigration for the union's division in the Canary Islands. In 2001 Diouf acquired Spanish citizenship.

Political career
Having participated in politics for a significant amount of time, in 2017 Diouf officially joined the Spanish Socialist Workers' Party. In June 2017 he was appointed to the Federal Executive Commission of the party. He was on the party's second ballot list in the April 2019 Spanish general election, where he was elected to the 13th Congress of Deputies. Together with Ignacio Garriga, Diouf is only the second individual of sub-Saharan African descent elected to congress after Rita Bosaho.

References

1965 births
Cheikh Anta Diop University alumni
Homeless people
Living people
Members of the 13th Congress of Deputies (Spain)
Members of the 14th Congress of Deputies (Spain)
Naturalised citizens of Spain
People from Thiès Region
Senegalese emigrants to Spain
Serer politicians
Spanish Socialist Workers' Party politicians
Spanish syndicalists
Spanish people of Senegalese descent